The  Kawasaki Ninja 400R is a motorcycle in the Ninja series from the Japanese manufacturer Kawasaki. It was announced for the 2011 model year, and is sold in Canada and New Zealand. No plans currently exist to bring the bike to the UK market. Instead, a new Ninja 400(2018) is introduced for the global market. While the new Ninja 400 is similar in many ways, it is mostly a different bike. The Ninja 400R is based on the Ninja 650R. There is also a naked version of the 400R called the ER-4n introduced in 2011 only sold in Japan.

See also 
 Kawasaki Ninja series

References

External links 
 Official pre-release site Canada

Ninja 400R
Standard motorcycles
Motorcycles powered by straight-twin engines